Perumpilly, also Perumpally, is a village in Kanayannur taluk of Ernakulam district in Kerala state, south India. Perumpilly is famous for historic Christian churches and Hindu temples. The nearest town is Mulanthuruthy.

Location
Perumpilly lies on the Ernakulam - Kottayam route through Mulanthuruthy, at 1 km from Mulanthuruthy and 3 km from kanjiramattom. The village is surrounded by paddy fields and the tributaries of Vembanad lake

Pilgrim Centres

Perumpilly Simhasana Church
Perumpilly has a very famous Jacobite church, the Perumpilly Simhasana Church.

St. George's Simhasana Church at Perumpilly was founded by late Mor Yulius Elias Qoro, Patriarchal Delegate to Malankara in 1938. The church building was rebuilt by late Geevarghese Mor Gregorious, metropolitan of Kochi diocese, who had served at this church for several years as vicar. In 1982, H. H. Patriarch Zakka I consecrated the church. A small portion of the zoonoro (girdle) of the Holy Virgin, discovered by Patriarch Aphrem I at Homs, and given to late Mor Gregorius by Patriarch Ya`qub III has been preserved at this church since 1974. The mortal remains of Metropolitan Geevarghese Mor gregorious were interred in the sanctuary of the church on 23 February 1999. Patriarch Zakka I visited this church again in April 2000 to offer memorial prayers at the tomb of the late Metropolitan.

Sree Narasimha Swamy temple
One of the oldest and rarest temples where the deity is Lord Sree Narasimha Swamy.
The temple is an ancient one and has got many stories related to the origin of Chottanikkara temple too. Currently the temple is maintained by Cochin Dewaswom board

Paadathukaav Bhagavathy Kshethram
The deity is Bhadrakali. The temple has a Banyan tree with its foundation (ആല്ത്തറ) and a pond (അമ്പലക്കുളം) near it.

Vailappilli Sreekrishna Swamy Kshethram

Other Info

Panar Bridge
A British made bridge connects Perumpilly to Amballur, which is obsolete, yet still stands as a memory of pre-independent period.

Hail Mary English Medium Residential Higher Secondary School
Hail Mary English Medium School Perumpally is a Higher Secondary school situated near Mulanthuruthy in the Ernakulam district of Kerala, India. The school was founded by the Perumpally St. George Simhasana church authorities under the special interest of Perumpally Thirumeni.

The school has produced 100% success for the SSLC since the time of starting. The school comes under the Thripunithura educational subdistrict. Apart from academics, the school also contributes in the arts and sports meets as well. There is a separate KG section for the grooming of little children.

Dharma Bharathi Ashram
Dharma Bharathi Mission (DBM), a socio-spiritual organization for human solidarity, holistic development and integral peace, has its Ashram situated in the village of Perumpilly.

Salvation Army church
An institution of Salvation Army International is situated in Perumpilly.

References 

Behind Rudrapilli kavu BHAGAVATI TEMPLE is (Kannoth)  Kochunarayana House is located.He is the son of kannoth(Neduvelil Bhagavati Temple)Kesavan Nair from Kannoth House.

Villages in Ernakulam district